Published by World Scientific, the Handbook of Porphyrin Science: With Applications to Chemistry, Physics, Materials Science, Engineering, Biology and Medicine is a multi-volume reference set edited by scientists Karl Kadish, Kevin Smith and Roger Guilard. The first ten volumes were published in 2010 and the next ten are expected to be published in 2011.

Topics covered include:
Developments in Supramolecular Chemistry Based on Porphyrins and Related Systems
Involvement of Porphyrins and Related Systems in Catalysis
Phototherapy, Radioimmunotherapy and Imaging
Advances in Synthesis and Coordination Chemistry of Porphyrins, Phthalocyanines and Related Systems
Heme Proteins

The current work stems from World Scientific's Journal of Porphyrins and Phthalocyanines (JPP)  and from  the research interests of the three editors and hundreds of authors who have presented the results of their research in this society-run journal since its founding in 1997.

References

External links
 
 

Chemistry books